The 2016 Elite One is the 56th season of the Cameroon Top League. The season began on 30 January 2016. UMS de Loum dominated the league, winning their first title by a 10-point margin over runner-up Cotonsport. It was a significant turnaround for UMS de Loum, who finished tied for 11th in 2015, just four points away from relegation.

Teams locations

Elite One consists of 18 teams for the 2016 season with three clubs relegated to Elite Two and three promoted. Fovu Club, Njala Quan and Tonnerre were all relegated to Elite Two after finishing in the last three spots of the 2015 season. Aigle Royal, Eding Sport FC and Racing Club Bafoussam were each promoted from Elite Two.

League table

Positions by round

References

Elite One seasons
Cam
Cam
1